The Oparinskaya narrow-gauge railway is a narrow-gauge railway in Kirov Oblast, Russia, built as an industrial railway (forest railway) for logging operations.

Current status 
Planning for the railway began in 1952 and building began in 1952-1955. In 1955 regular wood transport on the railway started, between Oparino and Forest villages. The Oparinskaya forestry railway's first line was constructed in 1952, in the area of Oparinsky District in Kirov Oblast from the village Oparino. The railway operates scheduled freight services from Oparino, used for forestry tasks such as the transportation of felled logs and forestry workers. In 2016, repairs are being made to the track.

Rolling stock

Locomotives 
 TU4 – № 2440
 TU6A – № 1032, 3065, 3751
 TU6D – № 0377
 TU7A – № 2351, 2761, 3308
 TU8 – № 0514

Railroad car 
 Boxcar
 Tank car
 Dining car
 Passenger car
 Side-tipping wagons
 Railway log-car and flatcar
 Hopper car to transport track ballast

Work trains 
 Snowplow
 Finnish crane 5E – № 1724 Valmet

See also
Narrow-gauge railways in Russia
List of Russian narrow-gauge railways rolling stock

References and sources

External links

 Photo - project «Steam Engine» 
 «The site of the railroad» S. Bolashenko 
750 mm gauge railways in Russia
Railway lines opened in 1952
Logging railways in Russia
Rail transport in Kirov Oblast